Hendrick Cottage is a historic building in Simsbury, Connecticut, United States. Dating to around 1795, it is believed to have been built by John Poisson. In 1965, it was moved half a mile from its original location (on the north bank of Hop Brook facing West Street) to become part of the collection of nine buildings comprising the Massacoh Plantation, part of Simsbury Center Historic District. It is named for its last owner, Fanny Josephine Pomeroy Hendrick.

The building is listed on the National Register of Historic Places.

Gallery

See also

National Register of Historic Places listings in Hartford County, Connecticut

References

18th-century establishments in Connecticut
Houses completed in the 19th century
Houses in Simsbury, Connecticut
Houses on the National Register of Historic Places in Connecticut
National Register of Historic Places in Hartford County, Connecticut